Elections to the consultative Regional Council (Landesrat) were held in the territory of the Saar Basin on 13 February 1932. The Centre Party remained the largest faction, winning 14 of the 30 seats. Peter Scheuer was re-elected as President of the Landesrat.

Results

References

Saar
1932
Parliamentary election